Real World Records is a British record label specializing in world music.  It was founded in 1989 by English musician Peter Gabriel and original members of WOMAD. A majority of the works released on Real World Records feature music recorded at Real World Studios, in Box, Wiltshire, England.

History

In 1999, the label had sold over 3 million records worldwide and released 90 albums. In 2015, it had reached the mark of over 200 albums.

Artists

 Afro Celt Sound System
 Ashkhabad
 Ayub Ogada
 Bernard Kabanda
 Big Blue Ball
 Charlie Winston
 Creole Choir of Cuba
 Dengue Fever
 Farafina
 Fatala

 Geoffrey Oryema
 Guo Brothers
 Hoba Hoba Spirit
 Johnny Kalsi
 Joi
 Joseph Arthur
 Les Amazones d'Afrique
 Little Axe
 Mamer

 Maryam Mursal
 Nusrat Fateh Ali Khan
 Ozomatli
 Paban Das Baul
 Pan-African Orchestra
 Papa Wemba
 Peter Gabriel
 Portico Quartet
 Rupert Hine
 Samuel Yirga

 Sheila Chandra
 Sevara Nazarkhan
 Spiro
 The Blind Boys of Alabama
 The Imagined Village
 U. Srinivas
 Värttinä
 Yungchen Lhamo

Partial discography
ABoneCroneDrone, Sheila Chandra, 1996
Among Brothers, Abderrahmane Abdelli, 2003
Atom Bomb, The Blind Boys of Alabama, 2005
Beat the Border, Geoffrey Oryema, 1993
Big Blue Ball, various artists, 2008 (recorded 1991, 1992, 1995)
Big City Secrets, Joseph Arthur, 1997
Black Rock, Djivan Gasparyan & Michael Brook, 1998
Coming Home, Yungchen Lhamo, 1998
Djabote, Doudou Ndiaye Rose, 1992
Emotion, Papa Wemba, 1995
En Mana Kuoyo, Ayub Ogada, 1993
Espace, Tama, 2002
Higher Ground, The Blind Boys of Alabama, with Robert Randolph and the Family Band, and special guest Ben Harper, 2002
In Your Hands, Charlie Winston, 2009
Le Voyageur, Papa Wemba
My Songs and a Poem, Estrella Morente, 2001
Mustt Mustt, Nusrat Fateh Ali Khan & Michael Brook, 1990
Night Song, Nusrat Fateh Ali Khan & Michael Brook, 1995
Night to Night, Geoffrey Oryema, 1996
Pod, Afro Celt Sound System, 2004
Plus from US, 1993
Quick Look, Pina, 2002
Rama Sreerama, U. Srinivas, 1994
Real Sugar, Paban Das Baul & Sam Mills, 1997
Sampradaya, Pandit Shiv Kumar Sharma, with Rahul Sharma, Shafaat Ahmed Khan & Manorama Sharma, 1999
Serious Tam, Telek, 2000
Sezoni, Mara! with Martenitsa Choir, 1999 (original release on Rufus Records, 1997)
Songs for the Poor Man, Remmy Ongala, 1989
The Journey, Maryam Mursal, 1998
The Last Prophet, Nusrat Fateh Ali Khan & Party, 1994
The Truth (Ny Marina), The Justin Vali Trio, 1995
The Zen Kiss, Sheila Chandra, 1994
Tibet, Tibet, Yungchen Lhamo, 1996
Trance, Hassan Hakmoun and Zahar, 1993
Untold Things, Jocelyn Pook, 2001
Volume 2: Release, Afro Celt Sound System, 1999
Volume 3: Further in Time, Afro Celt Sound System, 2001
Weaving My Ancestor's Voices Sheila Chandra, 1992
Yo‘l Bo‘lsin, Sevara Nazarkhan, 2003

References

1989 establishments in England
Record labels established in 1989
British record labels
 
 
World music record labels
Peter Gabriel
Virgin Records

de:Real World